Jackie Kazarian, is an American painter, video artist, and installation artist of Armenian descent.

Life

Ancestors 
Jackie Kazarian's grandfathers, Abram Bedrosian (Adana) and Kazar Kazarian (Tadem), both left Western Armenia before 1915, they were from Sivas, Marash, Tadem and Adana. Jachie's grandmother, Mariam Betlezian's father was a linguist professor and was taken and killed by Ottoman soldiers. Mariam's mother feared that her teen daughter would be abducted and/or enslaved, so placed her in an orphanage before she fled with her younger children.  Mariam eventually left the orphanage to become an immigrant bride and lived her life in Waukegan, Illinois.

Jachie's grandmother, Elmas Shahinian, was well-educated and came from a wealthy family in Sivas. Her grandfather owned a flour mill in Sivas, and lived with 22 family members and servants in a house that is now a post office.  When the home was confiscated by Ottoman soldiers, most of her family members were killed, but her father and uncle were spared for a while to run the mill.  Eventually, they were also killed.  Elmas became a young manager of a Sivas orphanage and went back to her home every week to give piano lessons to the Turkish captain's wife in exchange for flour to feed her mother and brother, who were living on the street. She eventually emigrated to the U.S. with them and lived the rest of her life in Milwaukee, WI.

Education
Jackie Kazarian was born in Chicago. She has studied at the School of the Art Institute of Chicago. In 1981 she graduated from Duke University, Durham, North Carolina, 1989 -Chicago Art Institute. 1984–1990 she worked in Encyclopædia Britannica, 1988 – 2005 at Chicago Art Institute։

Project 1915 
In 2015 to promote awareness of the culture and the tragedy, Jackie created her work Armenia (Hayasdan) for the 100th anniversary of the Armenian genocide. The painting is oriented in a way to reflect the view of Ararat and the names of the cities as if one is standing in historic Armenia and looking east.  The orientation also refers to the ancient Christian maps (called TO maps), with east at the top of the map, north to the left. The needle lace used in the painting and the praying hands at the base of the painting is from Jachie's grandmother, Mariam Betlezian, who was from Marash. The work will be displayed for the first time in Chicago's Mana Contemporary from April 17 to May 29.

Exhibitions 
2012 Jackie Kazarian, Bellvitge Art, Hospitalet de Llobregat, Barcelona, Spain
2010 Expect Nothing: New Works by Jackie Kazarian, Chicago Cultural Center
Jackie Kazarian, Damascus, Syria
Jackie Kazarian, Lattakia, Syria
2009 Jackie Kazarian, Union League Club of Chicago
2008 Jackie Kazarian, exhale, Alfedena Gallery, Chicago
Jackie Kazarian: breath, Stubbs, Chicago
 Jackie Kazarian, The Artist Project, Artropolis, Chicago
2007  Jackie Kazarian, The Artist Project, Artropolis, Chicago
 2006   Focus 5,  Illinois State Museum Gallery, Chicago
Gebben Gray Gallery, Fennville, MI
2004  Don’t Blink, Three Arts Club, Chicago
1998 From Mariam’s kitchen—the wallpaper series,  Boyadjian Gallery,
AGBU Alex  Manoogian Center, Pasadena, California
1996  Jackie Kazarian, The Garden Wall Papers, Klein Art Works, Chicago
1994  Klein Art Works, Chicago
1993 55 Mercer, New York City
Klein Art Works, Chicago
1991  Klein Art Works, Chicago
1935 Gallery, Chicago

Awards 
2010  Visiting Artist, United States Embassy, Damascus, Syria
2008  Fellowship, Ellen Stone Belic Institute for the Study of Women & Gender in the Arts & Media, Columbia College, Chicago
1996–2004 Advisory Board, Department of Cultural Affairs, Chicago
1998–2004 Exhibition Advisory Committee, Department of Cultural Affairs, Chicago
1997–2004 Grants Panelist (Chair), City Arts Program, City of Chicago
1991 Community Artist Assistance Program Grant, City of Chicago

Bibliography
Waxman, Lori.  "Stormy Weather, Antarctic Dreams,"  Chicago Tribune, September 3, 2010.
Darrell Roberts, "Jackie Kazarian Mammoth Abstraction @ the Chicago Cultural Center," artexaminer.com, 
Karissa Lang, "Jackie Kazarian at Alfadena Gallery," Newcity Chicago, March 27, 2008.
Lauren Weinberg, "Focus 5," Time Out Chicago, December 14–27, 2006.
Leah Pietrusiak, "The Seldoms at Flatfile Galleries," Time Out Chicago, October 12–18.
Alan Artner, "Preserving passing cultures, Momento Mori." Chicago Tribune, July 12, 2002.
Richard Christiansen, "Memory lane joyfully leads to local libraries."  Chicago Tribune, January 20, 2002.
Lynn Van Matre, "At Hindsdale show, art is full bloom."  Chicago Tribune, April 19, 2001
Phil Smith, "Interior spaces still lives," Dialogue, September/October 2000.
Laura Stoland, "Interior spaces still lives." New Art Examiner, September 2000.
Janet Samuelian, "AGBU presents Chicago innovator, artist Jackie Kazarian."  The Armenian Reporter International, August 8, 1998.
"Openings." Art and Antiques.  December 1994.
Michael Muster, "Jackie Kazarian."  New Art Examiner, April 1992.
Kathryn Hixson, "Chicago in review."  New Art Examiner, March 1992.
David McCracken, "Jackie Kazarian marks a good beginning."  Chicago Tribune, Dec.27,1991.    
Michael Bonesteel, "Ex-zoologist makes organic art."  Lake Forester, January 24, 1991.

See also
List of Armenian artists
List of Armenian women artists

References

External links
 Official page
 1915–2015: A Perpetual Reminder of Survival 

20th-century American painters
Armenian painters
American women painters
Armenian women painters
Living people
People from Chicago
Year of birth missing (living people)
American people of Armenian descent
21st-century American painters
20th-century American women
21st-century American women